Luwian, sometimes known as Luvian or Luish, is an ancient language, or group of languages, within the Anatolian branch of the Indo-European language family. The ethnonym Luwian comes from Luwiya (also spelled Luwia or Luvia) – the name of the region in which the Luwians lived. Luwiya is attested, for example, in the Hittite laws.

The two varieties of Proto-Luwian or Luwian (in the narrow sense of these names) are known after the scripts in which they were written: Cuneiform Luwian (CLuwian) and Hieroglyphic Luwian (HLuwian). There is no consensus as to whether these were a single language or two closely related languages.

Classification

Several other Anatolian languages – particularly Carian, Lycian, Lydian and Milyan (also known as Lycian B or Lycian II) – are now usually identified as related to Luwian – and as mutually connected more closely than other constituents of the Anatolian branch. This suggests that these languages formed a sub-branch within Anatolian. Some linguists follow Craig Melchert in referring to this broader group as Luwic, whereas others refer to the "Luwian group" (and, in that sense, "Luwian" may mean several distinct languages). Likewise, Proto-Luwian may mean the common ancestor of the whole group, or just the ancestor of Luwian (normally, under tree-naming conventions, were the branch to be called Luwic, its ancestor should be known as Proto-Luwic or Common Luwic; in practice, such names are seldom used). Luwic or Luwian (in the broad sense of the term), is one of three major sub-branches of Anatolian, alongside Hittite and Palaic.

As Luwian has numerous archaisms, it is regarded as important to the study of Indo-European languages (IE) in general, the other Anatolian languages, and the Bronze Age Aegean. These archaisms are often regarded as supporting the view that the Proto-Indo-European language (PIE) had three distinct sets of velar consonants: plain velars, palatovelars, and labiovelars. For Melchert, PIE  → Luwian z (probably );  → k; and  → ku (probably ). Luwian has also been enlisted for its verb kalut(t)i(ya)-, which means "make the rounds of" and is probably derived from *kalutta/i- "circle". It has been argued that this derives from a proto-Anatolian word for "wheel", which in turn would have derived from the common word for "wheel" found in all other Indo-European families. The wheel was invented in the 5th millennium BC and, if kaluti does derive from it, then the Anatolian branch left PIE after its invention (so validating the Kurgan hypothesis as applicable to Anatolian). However, kaluti need not imply a wheel and so need not have been derived from a PIE word with that meaning. The IE words for a wheel may well have arisen in those other IE languages after the Anatolian split.

Geographic and chronological distribution
Luwian was among the languages spoken during the 2nd and 1st millennia BC by groups in central and western Anatolia and northern Syria. The earliest Luwian texts in cuneiform transmission are attested in connection with the Kingdom of Kizzuwatna in southeastern Anatolia, as well as a number of locations in central Anatolia. Beginning in the 14th century BC, Luwian-speakers came to constitute the majority in the Hittite capital Hattusa. It appears that by the time of the collapse of the Hittite Empire ca. 1180 BC, the Hittite king and royal family were fully bilingual in Luwian. Long after the extinction of the Hittite language, Luwian continued to be spoken in the Neo-Hittite states of Syria, such as Milid and Carchemish, as well as in the central Anatolian kingdom of Tabal that flourished in the 8th century BC.

A number of scholars in the past attempted to argue for the Luwian homeland in western Anatolia. According to James Mellaart, the earliest Indo-Europeans in northwest Anatolia were the horse-riders who came to this region from the north and founded Demircihöyük (Eskişehir Province) in Phrygia c. 3000 BC. They were allegedly ancestors of the Luwians who inhabited Troy II, and spread widely in the Anatolian peninsula. He cited the distribution of a new type of wheel-made pottery, Red Slip Wares, as some of the best evidence for his theory. According to Mellaart, the proto-Luwian migrations to Anatolia came in several distinct waves over many centuries. The recent detailed review of Mellaart's claims suggests that his ethnolinguistic conclusions cannot be substantiated on archaeological grounds.

Other arguments were advanced for the extensive Luwian presence in western Anatolia in the late second millennium BC. In the Old Hittite version of the Hittite Code, some, if not all, of the Luwian-speaking areas were called Luwiya. Widmer (2007) has argued that the Mycenaean term ru-wa-ni-jo, attested in Linear B, refers to the same area. but the stem *Luwan- was recently shown to be non-existent. In a corrupt late copy of the Hittite Code the geographical term Luwiya is replaced with Arzawa a western Anatolian kingdom corresponding roughly with Mira and the Seha River Land. Therefore, several scholars shared the view that Luwian was spoken—to varying degrees—across a large portion of western Anatolia, including Troy (Wilusa), the Seha River Land (Sēḫa ~ Sēḫariya, i.e., the Greek Hermos river and Kaikos valley), and the Mira-Kuwaliya kingdom with its core being the Maeander valley. In a number of recent publications, however, the geographic identity between Luwiya and Arzawa was rejected or doubted. In the post-Hittite era, the region of Arzawa came to be known as Lydia (Assyrian Luddu, Greek Λυδία), where the Lydian language was in use. The name Lydia has been derived from the name Luwiya (Lydian *lūda- < *luw(i)da- < luwiya-, with regular Lydian sound change y > d). The Lydian language, however, cannot be regarded as the direct descendant of Luwian and probably does not even belong to the Luwic group (see Anatolian languages). Therefore, none of the arguments in favour of the Luwian linguistic dominance in Western Asia Minor can be regarded as compelling, although the issue continues to be debated.

Script and dialects
Luwian was split into many dialects, which were written in two different writing systems. One of these was the Cuneiform Luwian which used the form of Old Babylonian cuneiform that had been adapted for the Hittite language. The other was Hieroglyphic Luwian, which was written in a unique native hieroglyphic script. The differences between the dialects are minor, but they affect vocabulary, style, and grammar. The different orthographies of the two writing systems may also hide some differences.

Cuneiform Luwian

Cuneiform Luwian (or Kizzuwatna Luwian) is the corpus of Luwian texts attested in the tablet archives of Hattusa; it is essentially the same cuneiform writing system used in Hittite. In Laroche's Catalog of Hittite Texts, the corpus of Hittite cuneiform texts with Luwian insertions runs from CTH 757–773, mostly comprising rituals. Cuneiform Luwian texts are written in several dialects, of which the most easily identifiable are Kizzuwatna Luwian, Ištanuwa Luwian, and Empire Luwian. The last dialect represents the vernacular of Hattusan scribes of the 14th–13th centuries BC and is mainly attested through Glossenkeil words in Hittite texts.

Compared to cuneiform Hittite, logograms (signs with a set symbolic value) are rare. Instead, most writing is done with the syllabic characters, where a single symbol stands for a vowel, or a consonant-vowel pair (either VC or CV). A striking feature is the consistent use of 'full-writing' to indicate long vowels, even at the beginning of words. In this system a long vowel is indicated by writing it twice. For example, īdi "he goes" is written i-i-ti rather than i-ti, and ānda "in" is written a-an-ta rather than an-ta.

Hieroglyphic Luwian

Hieroglyphic Luwian is the corpus of Luwian texts written in a native script, known as Anatolian hieroglyphs. Once thought to be a variety of the Hittite language, "Hieroglyphic Hittite" was formerly used to refer to the language of the same inscriptions, but this term is now obsolete. The dialect of Luwian hieroglyphic inscriptions appears to be either Empire Luwian or its descendant, Iron Age Luwian.

The first report of a monumental inscription dates to 1850, when an inhabitant of Nevşehir reported the relief at Fraktin. In 1870, antiquarian travellers in Aleppo found another inscription built into the south wall of the Al-Qaiqan Mosque. In 1884, Polish scholar  discovered an inscription near Köylütolu, in western Turkey. The largest known inscription was excavated in 1970 in Yalburt, northwest of Konya. Luwian hieroglyphic texts contain a limited number of lexical borrowings from Hittite, Akkadian, and Northwest Semitic; the lexical borrowings from Greek are limited to proper nouns, although common nouns borrowed in the opposite direction do exist.

Phonology 
The reconstruction of the Luwian phoneme inventory is based mainly on the written texts and comparisons with the known development of other Indo-European languages. Two series of stops can be identified, transliterated as geminate in the cuneiform script. These fortis and lenis stops may have been distinguished by either voicing or gemination. The contrast was lost initially and finally, suggesting that any voicing only appeared intervocalically.

The following table provides a minimal consonant inventory, as can be reconstructed from the script. The existence of other consonants, which were not differentiated in writing, is possible.

There are only three vowels, a, i, and u, which could be short or long. Vowel length is not stable but changes with the stress and word position. For example, annan occurs alone as an adverb as ānnan ('underneath') but as a preposition, it becomes annān pātanza ('under the feet').

In loans to Ugaritic, these sounds are transcribed with <ḫ> and <ġ>, while in Egyptian they are transcribed with  ḫ and  g. As both of these languages had pharyngeal consonants, the Luwian sounds are unlikely to have been pharyngeal.

In transcriptions of Luwian cuneiform, š is traditionally distinguished from s, since they were originally distinct signs for two different sounds, but in Luwian, both signs probably represented the same s sound.

A noteworthy phonological development in Luwian is rhotacism; in some cases, d, l, and n become r. For example, *īdi ('he gets') becomes īri and wala- ('die') becomes wara-. Additionally, a d in word final position can be dropped, and an s may be added between two dental consonants and so *ad-tuwari becomes aztuwari ('you all eat') (ds and z are phonetically identical).

Morphology

Nouns 
There were two grammatical genders: animate and inanimate/neuter. There are two grammatical numbers: singular and plural. Some animate nouns could also take a collective plural in addition to the regular numerical plural.

Luwian had six cases:
 nominative
 genitive
 dative/locative
 accusative
 ablative/instrumental
 vocative

The vocative case occurs rarely in surviving texts and only in the singular.

In the animate gender, an -i- is inserted between the stem and the case ending. In hieroglyphic Luwian, the particle -sa/-za is added to the nominative/accusative inanimate case ending. In the genitive case, cuneiform and hieroglyphic Luwian differ sharply from each other. In cuneiform Luwian the possessive suffix -assa is used for the genitive singular and -assanz- is used for the genitive plural. In hieroglyphic Luwian, as in Hittite, the classical Indo-European suffixes -as for the genitive singular and -an for the plural are used. The special form of possessive adjectives with a plural possessor is restricted to Kizzuwatna Luwian and probably represents a calque from Hurrian.

Because of the prevalence of -assa place names and words scattered around all sides of the Aegean Sea, the possessive suffix was sometimes considered evidence of a shared non-Indo-European language or an Aegean Sprachbund preceding the arrivals of Luwians and Greeks. It is, however, possible to account for the Luwian possessive construction as a result of case attraction in the Indo-European noun phrase.

Adjective 

Adjectives agree with nouns in number and gender. Forms for the nominative and the accusative differ only in the animate gender and even then, only in the singular. For the sake of clarity, the table includes only the endings beginning with -a, but endings can also begin with an -i. The forms are largely derived from the forms of the nominal declension, with an -as- before the case ending that would be expected for nouns.

Pronouns 
In addition to personal pronouns typical of Anatolian languages, Luwian also has demonstrative pronouns, the which are formed from apa- and za-/zi-. The case endings are similar those of Hittite, but not all cases are attested for personal pronouns. In the third person, the demonstrative pronoun apa- occurs instead of the personal pronoun.

Possessive pronouns and demonstrative pronouns in apa- are declined as adjectives. All known forms of the personal pronouns are given, but it is not clear how their meanings differed or how they changed for different cases.

In addition to the forms given in the table, Luwian also had a demonstrative pronoun formed from the stem za-/zi-, but not all cases are known, and also a relative pronoun, which was declined regularly: kwis (nominative singular animate), kwin (accusative singular animate), kwinzi (nominative/accusative plural animate), kwati (ablative/instrumental singular), kwanza (dative/locative plural), kwaya (nominative/accusative plural inanimate). Some indefinite pronouns whose meanings are not entirely clear are also transmitted.

Verbs 
Like many other Indo-European languages, Luwian distinguishes two numbers (singular and plural) and three persons. There are two moods: indicative and imperative but no subjunctive. Only the active voice has been attested, but the existence of a mediopassive is assumed. There are two tenses: the present, which is used to express future events as well, and the preterite.

The conjugation is very similar to the Hittite ḫḫi conjugation.

A single participle can be formed with the suffix -a(i)mma. It has a passive sense for transitive verbs and a stative sense for intransitive verbs. The infinitive ends in -una.

Syntax 
The usual word order is subject-object-verb, but words can be moved to the front of the sentence for stress or to start a clause. Relative clauses are normally before the antecedent, but they sometimes follow the antecedent. Dependent words and adjectives are normally before their head word. Enclitic particles are often attached to the first word or conjunction.

Various conjunctions with temporal or conditional meaning are used to link clauses. There is no coordinating conjunction, but main clauses can be coordinated with the enclitic -ha, which is attached to the first word of the following clause. In narratives, clauses are linked by using the prosecutive conjunctions: a- before the first word of the following clause means 'and then', and pā, can be an independent conjunction at the start of a clause and the enclitic -pa indicates contrast or a change of theme.

The following example sentence demonstrates several common features of Luwian: a final verb, the particle chain headed by the conjunction a-, the quotative clitic -wa, and the preverb sarra adding directionality to the main verb awiha.

Vocabulary and texts 
The known Luwian vocabulary consists mostly of words inherited from Proto-Indo-European. Loan words for various technical and religious concepts derive mainly from Hurrian, and were often subsequently passed on through Luwian to Hittite.

The surviving corpus of Luwian texts consists principally of cuneiform ritual texts from the 16th and 15th centuries BC and monumental inscriptions in hieroglyphs. There are also some letters and economic documents. The majority of the hieroglyphic inscriptions derive from the 12th to 7th centuries BC, after the fall of the Hittite empire.

Another source of Luwian are the hieroglyphic seals which date from the 16th to the 7th centuries BC. Seals from the time of the Hittite empire are often digraphic, written in both cuneiform and hieroglyphics. However, the seals nearly always are limited to logograms. The absence of the syllabic symbols from the seals makes it impossible to determine the pronunciation of names and titles that appear on them, or even to make a certain attribution of the text to a specific language.

History of research
After the decipherment of Hittite, cuneiform Luwian was recognised as a separate, but related language by Emil Forrer in 1919. Further progress in the understanding of the language came after the Second World War, with the publication and analysis of a larger number of texts. Important work in this period was produced by Bernhard Rosenkranz, Heinrich Otten and Emmanuel Laroche. An important advance came in 1985 with the reorganisation of the whole text-corpus by Frank Starke.

The decipherment and classification of Hieroglyphic Luwian was much more difficult. In the 1920s, there were a number of failed attempts. In the 1930s some individual logograms and syllabic signs were correctly identified. At this point the classification of the language was not yet clear and, since it was believed to be a form of Hittite, it was referred to as Hieroglyphic Hittite. After a break in research due to the Second World War, there was breakthrough in 1947 with the discovery and publication of a Phoenician-Hieroglyphic Luwian bilingual text by Helmuth Theodor Bossert. The reading of several syllabic signs was still faulty, however, and as a result it was not realised that the cuneiform and hieroglyphic texts recorded the same language.

In the 1970s, as a result of a fundamental revision of the readings of a large number of hieroglyphs by John David Hawkins, Anna Morpurgo Davies, and Günter Neumann, it became clear that both cuneiform and hieroglyphic texts recorded the same Luwian language. This revision resulted from a discovery outside the area of Luwian settlement, namely the annotations on Urartian pots, written in the Urartian language using the hieroglyphic Luwian script. The sign , which had hitherto been read as ī was shown to be being used to indicate the sound za, which triggered a chain reaction resulting in an entirely new system of readings. Since that time, research has concentrated on better understanding the relationship between the two different forms of Luwian, in order to gain a clearer understanding of Luwian as a whole.

Trojan hypothesis
Luwian has been deduced as one of the likely candidates for the language spoken by the Trojans.

After the 1995 finding of a Luwian biconvex seal at Troy VII, there has been a heated discussion over the language that was spoken in Homeric Troy. Frank Starke of the University of Tübingen demonstrated that the name of Priam, king of Troy at the time of the Trojan War, is connected to the Luwian compound Priimuua, which means "exceptionally courageous". "The certainty is growing that Wilusa/Troy belonged to the greater Luwian-speaking community," but it is not entirely clear whether Luwian was primarily the official language or it was in daily colloquial use.

See also
Pre-Greek substrate

Notes

Sources

Beekes, R. S. P. "Luwians and Lydians", Kadmos 42 (2003): 47–9.
Gander, Max. "Asia, Ionia, Maeonia und Luwiya? Bemerkungen zu den neuen Toponymen aus Kom el-Hettan (Theben-West) mit Exkursen zu Westkleinasien in der Spätbronzezeit". Klio 97/2 (2015): 443-502.
Gander, Max "The West: Philology". Hittite Landscape and Geography, M. Weeden and L. Z. Ullmann (eds.). Leiden: Brill, 2017. pp. 262–280. 
Hawkins, J. D. "Tarkasnawa King of Mira: 'Tarkendemos', Boğazköy Sealings, and Karabel", Anatolian Studies 48 (1998): 1–31.
Hawkins, J. D. "The Arzawa letters in recent perspective", British Museum Studies in Ancient Egypt and Sudan 14 (2009): 73–83.
Hawkins, J. D. "A New Look at the Luwian Language". Kadmos 52/1 (2013): 1-18.
Laroche, Emmanuel. Catalogue des textes hittites. Paris: Klincksieck, 1971.
Matessi, A. "The Making of Hittite Imperial Landscapes: Territoriality and Balance of Power in South-Central Anatolia during the Late Bronze Age". Journal of Ancient Near Eastern History, AoP (2017).
Melchert H. Craig. "Greek mólybdos as a loanword from Lydian", in Anatolian Interfaces: Hittites, Greeks and their Neighbours, eds. B. J. Collins et al. Oxford: Oxbow Books, 2008, pp. 153–7.
Melchert, H. Craig. 'Lycian', in The Ancient Languages of Asia Minor, ed. R. D. Woodard. Cambridge: Cambridge University Press, 2008, pp. 46–55, esp. 46.
Melchert, H. Craig, ed. The Luwians. Boston: Brill, 2003. .
Melchert, H. Craig. Anatolian Historical Phonology. Amsterdam: Rodopi, 1994.
Melchert, H. Craig. Cuneiform Luvian Lexicon. Chapel Hill: self-published, 1993.
Melchert, H. Craig. "PIE velars in Luvian", in Studies in memory of Warren Cowgill (1929–1985): Papers from the Fourth East Coast Indo-European Conference, Cornell University, June 6–9, 1985, ed. C. Watkins. Berlin: Walter de Gruyter, 1987, pp. 182–204.
 
Otten, Heinrich. Zur grammatikalischen und lexikalischen Bestimmung des Luvischen. Berlin: Akademie-Verlag, 1953.
Rieken, Elisabeth. "Luwier, Lykier, Lyder—alle vom selben Stamm?", in Die Ausbreitung des Indogermanischen: Thesen aus Sprachwissenschaft, Archäologie und Genetik; Akten der Arbeitstagung der Indogermanischen Gesellschaft, Würzburg, 24–26 September 2009, ed. H. Hettrich & S. Ziegler. Wiesbaden: Reichert, 2012.
Rosenkranz, Bernhard. Beiträge zur Erforschung des Luvischen. Wiesbaden: Harrassowitz, 1952.
Sasseville, David. Anatolian Verbal Stem Formation. Leiden / New-York: Brill, 2021.
Singer, I. 2005. 'On Luwians and Hittites.' Bibliotheca Orientalis 62:430–51. (Review article of Melchert 2003).
Starke, Frank. 'Troia im Kontext des historisch-politischen und sprachlichen Umfeldes Kleinasiens im 2. Jahrtausend. Studia Troica 7:446–87.
Starke, Frank. Die keilschrift-luwischen Texte in Umschrift (StBoT 30, 1985)
Starke, Frank. Untersuchungen zur Stammbildung des keilschrift-luwischen Nomens (StBoT 30, 1990)
Watkins, C. 1995. How to Kill a Dragon: Aspects of Indo-European Poetics. New York and Oxford.
Watkins, C.1994. 'The Language of the Trojans.' In Selected Writings, ed. L. Oliver et al., vol. 2. 700–717. Innsbruck. = Troy and the Trojan War. A Symposium held at Bryn Mawr College, October 1984, ed. M. Mellink, 45–62. Bryn Mawr.
Widmer, P. 2006. 'Mykenisch ru-wa-ni-jo, "Luwier".' Kadmos 45:82–84.
Woudhuizen, Fred. The Language of the Sea Peoples. Amsterdam: Najade Pres, 1992.
Yakubovich, Ilya. Sociolinguistics of the Luvian Language. Leiden: Brill, 2010
Yakubovich, Ilya. "The Origin of Luwian Possessive Adjectives". In Proceedings of the 19th Annual UCLA Indo-European Conference, Los Angeles, November 3–4, 2007, ed. K. Jones-Bley et al., Washington: Institute for the Study of Man, 2008.
 Luwian Identities: Culture, Language and Religion between Anatolia and the Aegean. Brill, 2013.  (Hardback)  (e-Book)

Further reading

External links

 
Luwian Swadesh list of basic vocabulary words (from Wiktionary's Swadesh list appendix)
Arzawa, to the west, throws light on Hittites
Alekseev Manuscript
Hieroglyphic Luwian Phonetic Signs
Catalog of Hittite Texts: texts in other languages
Genitive Case and Possessive Adjective in Anatolian
Melchert's homepage on the UCLA website 

 
Cuneiform